Hint Water is an American beverage company based in San Francisco, California, as an alternative to soda and sugar beverages. It was started by former AOL employee Kara Goldin.

History
Hint Water was developed in 2004 when its founder, Kara Goldin, was unhappy with the sugar and preservatives in her juices. Goldin created the drink in her own home and sold it from her garage. She was diagnosed with gestational diabetes when pregnant, which also led her to develop a sugar-free alternative drink. Goldin left her job with AOL to become the CEO of Hint Water and later her husband, Theo Goldin, became the COO.

References

External links
 Official website

Companies based in San Francisco
Food and drink in the San Francisco Bay Area
Drink companies based in California